Khosravan-e Olya (also Romanized as Khosravān-e ‘Olyā; also known as Khosravān-e Bālā) is a village in Talkh Ab Rural District, Khenejin District, Farahan County, Markazi Province, Iran. At the 2006 census, its population was 77, in 32 families.

References 

Populated places in Farahan County